Karl Adolph (Vienna, May 19, 1869-ibidem, November 22, 1931) was an Austrian librarian and writer.

He also worked as a painting assistant and for the administration of Vienna General Hospital.

His works describe the life of proletarians and petits bourgeois in Vienna's suburbs.

Works
 Lyrisches (1897)
 Haus Nr. 37 (1908)
 Schackerl  (1912)
 Töchter  (1914)
 Am 1. Mai (1919)

Prizes
Bauernfeld-Preis (1914)

References

1869 births
1931 deaths
19th-century Austrian male writers
20th-century Austrian male writers
Writers from Vienna
19th-century Austrian writers
20th-century Austrian writers
Austrian librarians